The 1983 Blue Swords was a senior international figure skating competition in East Germany. Skaters from fourteen countries participated at the competition in East Berlin. The competition was held November 23–26 1983. Medals were awarded in the disciplines of men's singles, ladies' singles and pair skating. Boris Uspenski won the men's title for the Soviet Union. Janina Wirth and Birgit Lorenz / Knut Schubert won gold for East Germany in the ladies' and pairs' categories, respectively.

Men

Ladies

Pairs

References

Blue Swords
1983 in figure skating